Jack Michael McManus (born 4 August 1984) is an English, BRIT School-educated singer-songwriter, from West Wickham, London, in England. In 2012, he married actress and singer Martine McCutcheon.

Music career
A singer who has been compared to Elton John and Billy Joel McManus' debut album Either Side Of Midnight was released on Polydor Records/UMRL on 5 May 2008, preceded by his first single "Bang on the Piano" on 28 April. His single "You Think I Don't Care" was released on 7 July. McManus co-wrote "From The Rooftops" with Groove Armada for their Soundboy Rock album. and has toured with musicians such as John Mayer, Scouting for Girls, Amy MacDonald, and Sam Sparro. Jack is co-writer of the song "Separate Cars" on Boyzone's album, Brother.

Personal life
McManus married actress-singer Martine McCutcheon, with whom he has been in a relationship since 2007, They were married at Lake Como in September 2012. Together they have one child.

Discography

Albums
2008 – Either Side of Midnight – No. 22 UK

Singles
2008 – "Bang on the Piano" – No. 21 NL, No. 45 UK
2008 – "You Think I Don't Care"
2010 – "Heart Attack"

As featured artist

References

External links

 Jack McManus’ Official Website
 Jack McManus MySpace page
 Polydor Records Official Site
 Jack McManus profile piece from The Guardian

1984 births
Living people
English pop guitarists
English male guitarists
English pop singers
English male singer-songwriters
People from Bromley
Polydor Records artists
Musicians from Kent
21st-century English singers
21st-century British guitarists
21st-century British male singers